Macrorie may refer to:

Macrorie, Saskatchewan, village in Canada
Macrorie (surname)

See also
 McCrorie, a surname